Alice in Wonderland is a 2010 American period adventure fantasy film directed by Tim Burton from a screenplay written by Linda Woolverton and produced by Walt Disney Pictures. The film stars Mia Wasikowska in the title role, with Johnny Depp, Anne Hathaway, Helena Bonham Carter, Crispin Glover, and Matt Lucas, while featuring the voices of Alan Rickman, Stephen Fry, Michael Sheen, and Timothy Spall. A live-action adaptation and re-imagining of Lewis Carroll's works, the film follows Alice Kingsleigh, a nineteen-year-old who accidentally falls down a rabbit hole, returns to Underland and alongside the Mad Hatter, helps restore the White Queen to her throne by fighting against the Red Queen and her Jabberwocky, a dragon that terrorizes Underland's inhabitants.

Alice in Wonderland came under development in December 2007, when Burton was asked to direct two 3D films for Disney, including the remake of Frankenweenie. Production began in September 2008 and concluded within three months, and was shot in the United Kingdom and the United States. It was followed by an extensive pre-production and visual effects process, where filming included live-action and motion capture sequences. The film premiered in London at the Odeon Leicester Square on February 25, 2010, and was released in the United Kingdom and the United States through the Disney Digital 3D, RealD 3D, and IMAX 3D formats as well as in conventional theaters on March 5, 2010.

Alice in Wonderland received "mixed or average" reviews on Metacritic.  Rotten Tomatoes, which classified it as "rotten", summarized the critical consensus as criticizing the film's "narrative coherence" but praising its visuals. The film generated over $1.025 billion in ticket sales and became the fifth highest-grossing film during its theatrical run, and it is also the second-highest-grossing film of 2010. It received three nominations at the 68th Golden Globe Awards, including Best Motion Picture – Musical or Comedy. At the 83rd Academy Awards, it won Best Art Direction and Best Costume Design, and was also nominated for Best Visual Effects.

While not the first such film in its genre, Alice in Wonderland is credited with starting a trend of live-action fairy tale and fantasy films being green-lit, particularly from Walt Disney Studios. A sequel, titled Alice Through the Looking Glass, was released on May 27, 2016.

Plot
In 1871, 19-year-old Alice Kingsleigh is troubled by strange recurring dreams, mourning the death of her father, and fighting the stifling expectations of the society in which she lives. She receives an unwanted marriage proposal from Hamish Ascot at his father's garden party, where she spots a familiar white rabbit wearing a waistcoat and carrying a pocket watch. She follows it down a rabbit hole and she eats a cake labeled 'Eat Me' (called Upelkuchen), she grows taller until she is a giantess. She shrinks after drinking from a bottle labeled 'Drink Me' (called Pishsalver), allowing her to enter the forest of a fantastical place called Underland. There she is greeted by the White Rabbit, a Dormouse, a Dodo, Talking Flowers, and identical twins Tweedledum and Tweedledee, who all apparently know her.

Alice asserts that she is dreaming, but learns from Absolem the Caterpillar that she is destined to slay the Jabberwocky and end the tyranny of the Red Queen. The group is ambushed by the ravenous Bandersnatch and the Red Queen's knights, led by the Knave of Hearts. All are captured except Alice, who escapes, and the Dormouse, who takes one of the Bandersnatch's eyes. The Knave informs the Red Queen of Alice's return and he is ordered to find her immediately.

The Cheshire Cat guides Alice to the Mad Hatter, the March Hare, and the Dormouse's tea party. The Hatter explains that the Red Queen took over Underland, usurping her sister the White Queen, and that he joined the resistance after she destroyed his village and killed his family. The red knights seize the party and the Hatter saves Alice from capture by allowing himself to be seized. Alice is found by the Knave's Bloodhound who is allied with the resistance, who takes Alice to the Red Queen's castle, where she grows enormous and outgrows her clothes after eating a cake labeled 'Eat Me' (called Upelkuchen), infiltrating the castle as a courtier named "Um".

Alice learns that the vorpal sword, the only weapon capable of killing the Jabberwocky, is locked inside the Bandersnatch's den. She rebuffs advances from the Knave, leading the jealous Red Queen to demand her beheading. Alice obtains the sword and returns the Bandersnatch's eye, who gratefully helps her escape the castle and delivers her to the White Queen, who gives Alice a potion that returns her normal size. The Cheshire Cat uses his shapeshifting powers to save the Mad Hatter, who incites rebellion amongst the Queen's subjects before escaping. Absolem finally gets Alice to realize Underland is real, evoking memories of her visit when she was a little girl and called it "Wonderland", and advises her to fight the Jabberwocky just before completing his transformation into a pupa.

The Queens gather their armies on a chessboard-like battlefield and send Alice and the Jabberwocky to decide the battle in single combat. As the two armies battle, Alice beheads the Jabberwocky with the vorpal sword. The red knights turn against their ruler and the White Queen banishes her sister and the Knave into exile together. The White Queen gives Alice a vial of the Jabberwocky's purple blood, which can fulfill one wish, and she decides to return to her world after saying farewell to her friends. 

Alice then awakes and gets out of the rabbit hole, dirty and scratched from her fall. When she returns to the gazebo at the garden party, she refuses Hamish's proposal and impresses Lord Ascot with her idea of establishing trade routes to Hong Kong, inspiring him to take her as his apprentice. Alice prepares to set off on a trading ship, where a blue butterfly lands on her shoulder, which she recognizes as Absolem.

Cast

 Johnny Depp as Tarrant Hightopp, the Mad Hatter, a hammy yet bitter resident of Underland who becomes Alice's closest friend. Depp was announced to have been cast on September 24, 2008, while reports of his involvement in the project surfaced two months earlier. Wasikowska said that the characters "both feel like outsiders and feel alone in their separate worlds, and have a special bond and friendship with Alice." Burton explained that Depp "tried to find a grounding to the character … as opposed to just being mad." Burton also said that "[i]n a lot of versions it's a very one-note kind of character and you know [Depp's] goal was to try and bring out a human side to the strangeness of the character." The orange hair is an allusion to the mercury poisoning suffered by hatters who used mercury to cure felt; Depp believes that the character "was poisoned … and it was coming out through his hair, through his fingernails and eyes". Depp and Burton decided that the Hatter's clothes, skin, hair, personality and accent would change throughout the film to reflect his emotions. In an interview with Depp, the character was paralleled to "a mood ring, [as] his emotions are very close to the surface". The Hatter is "made up of different people and their extreme sides", with a gentle voice much like the character's creator Lewis Carroll reflecting the lighter personality and with a Scottish Glaswegian accent (which Depp modeled after Gregor Fisher's Rab C. Nesbitt character) reflecting a darker, more dangerous personality.
 Illusionary dancer David "Elsewhere" Bernal doubled for Depp during the "Futterwacken" sequence near the end of the film.
 Mia Wasikowska as Alice Kingsleigh, a reserved yet headstrong young woman who struggles to conform to society's expectations. As the film progresses, she becomes more strong-willed and confident in her decisions and choosing her path. Wasikowska was announced to have been cast on July 23, 2008. Burton originally wanted to offer the part to Frances Bean Cobain, but she refused, wanting to focus on her university studies. Lindsay Lohan, Amanda Seyfried, and Dakota Blue Richards expressed interest in playing the role, while Jennifer Lawrence, Cara Delevingne, and Jessica Brown Findlay went through an audition, with Brown Findlay being down to the last three. Wasikowska sent an audition tape in February 2008 and ended up coming over to the United Kingdom and doing four more auditions with Burton before she was cast. Wasikowska read Carroll's books as a child and re-read them to prepare for her role. She also watched Jan Švankmajer's Alice. She said, "When we were kids, my mum would pop it in the VCR player. We would be disturbed, and wouldn't really understand it, but we couldn't look away because it was too intriguing. So I had kept that feeling about Alice, a kind of haunting feeling."
 Mairi Ella Challen as six-year-old Alice. 

 Helena Bonham Carter as Iracebeth of Crims, the Red Queen, Mirana's short-tempered and murderous sister, and the self-proclaimed ruler of Underland. She is an amalgamation of two Carroll characters—the Red Queen and the Queen of Hearts. Her first name is a play on the word irascible because she is easily irritated, obstreperous, impatient, and quick to anger. Bonham Carter was announced to have been cast on October 7, 2008. Bonham Carter's head was digitally increased to three times its original size on screen. The character hates animals, and chooses to use them as servants and furniture. It is implied that the Red Queen beheaded her late husband, the King. The actress took inspiration from her young daughter Nell, a toddler, stating, "The Red Queen is just like a toddler, because she's got a big head and she's a tyrant." Her appearance is based on England's Queen Elizabeth I.
 Anne Hathaway as Mirana of Marmoreal, the White Queen, Iracebeth's calm and caring sister, and the rightful ruler of Underland. She is one of the few characters that did not require digital manipulation. Hathaway was announced to have been cast on October 7, 2008. In the early stages of the film's development, before Burton was attached to the project, Hathaway was offered the part of Alice, but she turned it down as she was more interested in playing the White Queen. After Burton came on board, another actress was cast in the role, but she left the project due to scheduling conflicts, and Disney suggested Hathaway instead. According to Burton, the character's image was influenced by Nigella Lawson, while Hathaway also cited David Bowie, Debbie Harry, Greta Garbo, and the artwork of Dan Flavin as inspiration for her performance. Hathaway described the White Queen as a "punk-rock vegan pacifist… She comes from the same gene pool as the Red Queen. She really likes the dark side, but she's so scared of going too far into it that she's made everything appear very light and happy. But she's living in that place out of fear that she won't be able to control herself." She also summed up her character with a caption on a magnet of Happy Bunny holding a knife, which a friend gave her, "Cute but psycho, it evens out."
 Crispin Glover as Ilosovic Stayne, the Knave of Hearts, Iracebeth's arrogant and vile minion, whom she believes to be her lover, but this proves to be false. While he follows the Red Queen's every order, he is the only one capable of calming her dramatic mood swings. Glover was announced to have been cast on October 24, 2008. Glover said, "The Red Queen has a fair amount of short-tempered reactions to things that people do, and so [the Knave] has to be quite diplomatic."
 Matt Lucas as Tweedledee and Tweedledum, two identical men and Tarrant's lieutenants at the resistance against the Red Queen who are the Red Queen's "fat boys" during their capture. Burton commented on the mixture of animation and Lucas, saying that "It's a weird mixture of things which gives his characters the disturbing quality that they so richly deserve." The characters are portrayed through a combination of CGI and live-action, with Lucas's face digitally composited to a full animated body. While performing the character, Lucas had to wear a teardrop-shaped motion capture suit and walk on stilts. In order to play both characters, Lucas was doubled by Ethan Cohn.
 Frances de la Tour as Imogene, Alice's aunt. She is experiencing severe delusions and is constantly awaiting her fictional fiancé whom she believes to be a prince.
 Leo Bill as Hamish Ascot, Alice's rival and ex-fiancé.
 Hannah Hosking as backing dancer at Alice and Hamish’s wedding.

Marton Csokas makes a cameo appearance as Alice's deceased father in the film's opening scene and Alice's mother is played by Lindsay Duncan. Lord and Lady Ascot are played by Tim Pigott-Smith and Geraldine James, respectively. Eleanor Tomlinson and Eleanor Gecks play the Chattaway sisters. Jemma Powell appears briefly as Alice's sister, Margaret, while Margaret's unfaithful husband Lowell is played by John Hopkins.

Voice cast
 Michael Sheen as Nivens McTwisp, the White Rabbit, Mirana's grand vizier and Tarrant's chief officer of the resistance. Sheen said the character "is such an iconic character that [he] didn't feel like [he] should break the mold too much." Burton said the quality he wanted most in his clock-watching bunny was a twitchiness, also commenting that "[in] any incarnation of the [White Rabbit] through the years, there's that sort of nervousness of a rabbit."
 Alan Rickman as Absolem, the Caterpillar, the head of the resistance. Rickman was originally going to have his face composited onto the animated Caterpillar. He was filmed recording his voice in the studio, but the idea was eventually scrapped. The animators did, however, try to give Absolem's face characteristics similar to Rickman's.
 Stephen Fry as Cheshire: Tarrant's bodyguard and the general of the resistance. Burton stated that the character had a creepy quality in addition to tapping into his own hatred of cats. The role was intended to be played by Sheen but he changed his role to the White Rabbit due to scheduling conflicts.
 Barbara Windsor as Mallymkun, the Dormouse: Tarrant's assistant and the sergeant of the resistance. Burton said that he sought after Windsor for the role because he was a fan of her character in the TV series EastEnders. Her voice sealed the deal for her role as the character.
 Timothy Spall as Bayard Hamar: Stayne's former pet dog and messenger of the resistance. Although Bayard does not appear in the book, a similar character named The Puppy is likely the inspiration for the character.
 Paul Whitehouse as Thackery Earwicket, the March Hare: Tarrant's partner and the admiral of the resistance. Burton stated that because Whitehouse is a great comedic actor, a lot of his lines came from improvisation.
 Michael Gough as Uilleam, the Dodo: The navigator of the resistance. Burton said that Gough was the first person he thought of for the role of Uilleam because he has "a full life quality to his voice". The character only speaks three lines, that Gough recorded in a day. This would be Gough's final acting role; he died a year after its release, aged 94. Gough had previously portrayed the March Hare in the 1966 TV play of the book.
 Christopher Lee as The Jabberwocky (sic): Iracebeth's pet dragon and assassin. While it only had two lines, Burton said that he felt Lee to be a good match for the iconic character because he is "an iconic guy". For the character, Lee had originally tried to make his voice "burble" (as described in the poem "Jabberwocky"). However, Burton persuaded him to use his actual voice, as he found it more intimidating and aggressive.
 Imelda Staunton as The Talking Flowers: Though there are many flowers that appear around Underland, only one of them speaks and one of them is clearly a caricature of Staunton. Staunton only speaks three lines that are heard very briefly at the beginning of the film.
 Jim Carter as The Executioner: The Executioner only speaks one line and appears extremely briefly, though Carter also voiced several other servants to the Red Queen.
Frank Welker provided additional voices and vocal effects; including roars of the Jabberwocky and Bandersnatch, squawks for the Jubjub bird, and Bayard's barking. Rickman, Windsor, Fry, Gough, Lee, Staunton and Carter each took only a day to record their dialogue.

Production

Development and writing
In 2006, while searching for ideas for a large fantasy movie, Joe Roth, Jennifer and Suzanne Todd approached Linda Woolverton, who proposed a concept of grown-up Alice, from Lewis Carroll's novels Alice's Adventures in Wonderland and Through the Looking-Glass, returning to Wonderland, which she had in her head for a while. Roth pitched the idea to Walt Disney Studios, who greenlit the project, and Woolverton was commissioned to write the script. The first draft, titled Alice, was finished on February 23, 2007, after which it was submitted to Tim Burton, who agreed to helm the project. In April 2007, it was revealed that the film would be a blend of live-action and motion capture, and in November of the same year, Burton was officially confirmed to direct both Alice in Wonderland and a feature-length remake of his 1984 short film Frankenweenie in Disney Digital 3D. Burton developed the story because he never felt an emotional tie to the original book.

He explained "the goal is to try to make it an engaging movie where you get some of the psychology and kind of bring a freshness but also keep the classic nature of Alice." On prior versions, Burton said "It was always a girl wandering around from one crazy character to another, and I never really felt any real emotional connection." His goal with the new film is to give the story "some framework of emotional grounding" and "to try and make Alice feel more like a story as opposed to a series of events." Burton focused on the poem "Jabberwocky" as part of his structure, and refers to the described creature by the name of the poem rather than by the name "Jabberwock" used in the poem. Burton also stated that he does not see his version as either a sequel to any existing Alice film nor as a "re-imagining". However, the idea of the climax of the story being Alice's battle with the Queen's champion, the Jabberwocky, was first added in the video game American McGee's Alice, and the landscape, tower, weapons and appearance of Alice in those scenes of the film are very reminiscent of the same scenes in the game.

Filming

This film was originally set to be released on March 19, 2010 but was moved up to March 5, 2010. Principal photography was scheduled for May 2008, but did not begin until September and concluded in three months. Scenes set in the Victorian era were shot at Torpoint and Plymouth from September 1 to October 14. Two hundred and fifty local extras were chosen in early August. Locations included Antony House in Torpoint, Charlestown, Cornwall and the Barbican, however, no footage from the Barbican was used. Motion capture filming began in early October at Sony Pictures Studios in Culver City, California, though the footage was later discarded. Filming also took place at Culver Studios. Burton said that he used a combination of live action and animation, without motion capture. He also noted that this was the first time he had filmed on a green screen. Filming of the green screen portions, comprising 90% of the film, was completed after only 40 days. Many of the cast and crew felt nauseated as a result of the long hours surrounded by green, and Burton had lavender lenses fitted into his glasses to counteract the effect. Due to the constant need for digital effects to distort the actors' physical appearances, such as the size of the Red Queen's head or Alice's height, visual effects supervisor Ken Ralston cited the film as being exhausting, saying it was "The biggest show I've ever done, [and] the most creatively involved I've ever been."

Sony Pictures Imageworks designed the visual effects sequences. Burton felt 3D was appropriate to the story's environment. Burton and Zanuck chose to film with conventional cameras, and convert the footage into 3D during post-production; Zanuck explained 3D cameras were too expensive and "clumsy" to use, and they felt that there was no difference between converted footage and those shot in the format. James Cameron, who released his 3D film Avatar in December 2009, criticized the choice, stating, "It doesn't make any sense to shoot in 2D and convert to 3D".

Music

Danny Elfman composed the musical score for Alice in Wonderland, after regularly scoring for Burton's films. Elfman did not want to use period music and instead blended orchestral, classical and pop music, to highlight the internal score, and had used symphony orchestration for the visual style of Burton, incorporating the same methods by Erich Wolfgang Korngold, Max Steiner, Franz Waxman and Bernard Hermann. The score album was released by Walt Disney Records on March 2, 2010, and debuted at number 89 on the Billboard Top 200 albums chart.

A concept album titled Almost Alice is a collection of various artists' music inspired by the film. It was released by Walt Disney under the Buena Vista Records imprint, the same day as the score album's release. The lead single, "Alice" by Avril Lavigne, premiered on January 27, 2010, on Ryan Seacrest's radio program. Other singles include "Follow Me Down" by 3OH!3, "Her Name Is Alice" by Shinedown, and "Tea Party" by Kerli.

Marketing

Promotions 

On June 22, 2009, the first pictures of the film were released, showing Depp as the Mad Hatter, Hathaway as the White Queen, Bonham Carter as the Red Queen and Lucas as Tweedledee and Tweedledum. A new image of Alice was also released. In July, new photos emerged of Alice holding a white rabbit, the Mad Hatter with a hare, the Red Queen holding a pig, and the White Queen with a mouse.

On July 22, 2009, a teaser trailer from the Mad Hatter's point of view was released on IGN but was shortly taken down because Disney claimed that the trailer was not supposed to be out yet. The teaser was also planned to premiere along with a trailer of Robert Zemeckis' film adaptation of A Christmas Carol on July 24, 2009, for G-Force. The following day, the teaser trailer premiered at Comic-Con but the trailer shown was different from the one that leaked. The ComicCon version didn't have the Mad Hatter's dialogue. Instead, it featured "Time to Pretend" by MGMT, and the clips shown were in a different order than in the leaked version. The leaked version was originally to be shown to one of the three Facebook groups used to promote the film that had the most members. The groups used to promote the film are "The Loyal Subjects of the Red Queen", "The Loyal Subjects of the White Queen" and "The Disloyal Subjects of the Mad Hatter".

Also at ComicCon, props from the film were displayed in an "Alice in Wonderland" exhibit. Costumes featured in the exhibit included the Red Queen's dress, chair, wig, glasses, and scepter; the White Queen's dress, wig and a small model of her castle; the Mad Hatter's suit, hat, wig, chair and table; Alice's dress and battle armor (to slay the Jabberwocky). Other props included the "DRINK ME" bottles, the keys, an "EAT ME" pastry and stand-in models of the White Rabbit and March Hare.

A nighttime party area at the Disney California Adventure theme park was created, called "Mad T Party".

Video games

On July 23, 2009, Disney Interactive Studios announced that an Alice in Wonderland video game, developed by French game studio Étranges Libellules, would be released in the same week as the film for the Wii, Nintendo DS, and Microsoft Windows. The soundtrack was composed by video games music composer Richard Jacques. The Wii, DS, and PC versions were released on March 2, 2010.

Disney Interactive released in 2013 the game Alice in Wonderland: A New Champion for iOS.

Release

Theatrical 
Alice in Wonderland was theatrically released in United Kingdom and United States, in both Disney Digital 3D and IMAX 3D, as well as regular theatres on March 5, 2010. Prior to the release, the film was premiered at the Odeon Leicester Square in London on February 25, 2010, for the fundraiser The Prince's Foundation for Children and The Arts where the Prince of Wales and the Duchess of Cornwall attended.

On February 12, 2010, major UK theater chains, Odeon, Vue, and Cineworld, had planned to boycott the film because of a reduction of the interval between cinema and DVD release from the usual seventeen-week period to twelve. Disney's pretext for cutting short Alices theatrical run, is possibly to avoid the release of the DVD clashing with the 2010 FIFA World Cup. However, exhibitors protested that Alice would be less threatened by the World Cup than other titles. A week after the announcement, Cineworld, who has a 24% share of UK box office, chose to play the film on more than 150 screens. Cineworld's chief executive Steve Wiener stated, "As leaders in 3D, we did not want the public to miss out on such a visual spectacle. As the success of Avatar has shown, there is currently a huge appetite for the 3D experience". Shortly after, the Vue cinema chain also reached an agreement with Disney, but Odeon had still chosen to boycott in Britain, Ireland, and Italy. On February 25, 2010, Odeon had reached an agreement and decided to show the film on March 5. It also did not affect their plans to show the film in Spain, Germany, Portugal, and Austria.

Home media
Walt Disney Studios Home Entertainment released a three-disc Blu-ray combo pack (which includes the Blu-ray, DVD and a digital copy), single-disc Blu-ray and single-disc DVD on June 1, 2010, in North America and July 1, 2010, in Australia. The DVD release includes three short features about the making of the film, focusing on Burton's vision for Wonderland and the characters of Alice and the Mad Hatter. The Blu-ray version has nine additional featurettes centered on additional characters, special effects and other aspects of the film's production. In some confusion, a small number of copies were put on shelves a week before schedule in smaller stores, but were quickly removed, although a handful of copies were confirmed purchased ahead of schedule.

In its first week of release (June 1–6, 2010), it sold 2,095,878 DVD units (equivalent to $35,441,297) and topped the DVD sales chart for two continuous weeks. By May 22, 2011, it had sold 4,313,680 units ($76,413,043). It failed to crack the 2010 top ten DVDs list in terms of units sold, but reached 10th place on that chart in terms of sales revenue.

Reception

Box office
Alice in Wonderland has grossed $334,191,110 in North America and $691,276,000 in other territories for a worldwide total of $1,025,467,110 against a budget of $200 million. Worldwide, it is the second-highest-grossing film of 2010. It is the third-highest-grossing film starring Johnny Depp, the highest-grossing film directed by Tim Burton, and the second-highest-grossing film of Anne Hathaway. Additionally, it is the second-highest-grossing children's book adaptation (worldwide, as well as in North America and outside North America separately).

On its first weekend, the film made $220.1 million worldwide, marking the second-largest opening ever for a movie not released during the summer or the holiday period (behind The Hunger Games), the fourth-largest for a Disney-distributed film and the fourth-largest among 2010 films. It dominated for three consecutive weekends at the worldwide box office. On May 26, 2010, its 85th day of release, it became the sixth film ever to surpass the $1 billion mark and the second film that had been released by Walt Disney Studios that did so.

In North America, Alice in Wonderland is the forty-fourth-highest-grossing film but out of the top 100 when adjusted for inflation. It is also the second-highest-grossing film of 2010, behind Toy Story 3, the second-highest-grossing film starring Johnny Depp and the highest-grossing film directed by Tim Burton. The film opened on March 5, 2010, on approximately 7,400 screens at 3,728 theaters with $40,804,962 during its first day, $3.9 million of which came from midnight showings, ranking number one and setting a new March opening-day record. Alice earned $116.1 million on its opening weekend, breaking the record for the largest opening weekend in March (previously held by 300), the record for the largest opening weekend during springtime (previously held by Fast & Furious), the largest opening weekend for a non-sequel (previously held by Spider-Man) and the highest one for the non-holiday, non-summer period. However, all of these records were broken by The Hunger Games ($152.5 million) in March 2012. Alice made the seventeenth-highest-grossing opening weekend ever and the fifth-largest among 3D films. Opening-weekend grosses originating from 3D showings were $81.3 million (70% of total weekend gross). This broke the record for the largest opening-weekend 3D grosses but it was later topped by The Avengers ($108 million). It had the largest weekend per-theater average of 2010 ($31,143 per theater) and the largest for a PG-rated film. It broke the IMAX opening-weekend record by earning $12.2 million on 188 IMAX screens, with an average of $64,197 per site. The record was first overtaken by Deathly Hallows – Part 2 ($15.2 million). Additionally, it had the biggest opening weekend for a film starring Tim Burton, smashing the previous record held by Planet of the Apes. Alice remained in first place for three consecutive weekends at the North American box office. Alice closed in theaters on July 8, 2010, with $334.2 million.

Outside North America, Alice is the thirteenth-highest-grossing film, the highest-grossing 2010 film, the fourth-highest-grossing Disney film, the second-highest-grossing film starring Johnny Depp and the highest-grossing film directed by Tim Burton. It began with an estimated $94 million, on top of the weekend box office, and remained at the summit for four consecutive weekends and five in total. Japan was the film's highest-grossing country after North America, with $133.7 million, followed by the UK, Ireland and Malta ($64.4 million), and France and the Maghreb region ($45.9 million).

Critical response
On the review aggregator Rotten Tomatoes, 51% of 278 critics have given the film a positive review, with an average rating of 5.8/10. The website's consensus is: "Tim Burton's Alice sacrifices the book's minimal narrative coherence—and much of its heart—but it's an undeniable visual treat". According to Metacritic, which calculated a weighted average score of 53 out of 100 based on 38 reviews, the film received "mixed or average reviews". Audiences polled by CinemaScore gave the film an average rating of "A−" on an A+ to F scale.

Todd McCarthy of Variety praised it for its "moments of delight, humor and bedazzlement", but went on to say, "But it also becomes more ordinary as it goes along, building to a generic battle climax similar to any number of others in CGI-heavy movies of the past few years". Michael Rechtshaffen of The Hollywood Reporter said "Burton has delivered a subversively witty, brilliantly cast, whimsically appointed dazzler that also manages to hit all the emotionally satisfying marks", while as well praising its computer-generated imagery (CGI), saying "Ultimately, it's the visual landscape that makes Alice's newest adventure so wondrous, as technology has finally been able to catch up with Burton's endlessly fertile imagination." Owen Gleiberman of Entertainment Weekly said, "But Burton's Disneyfied 3-D Alice in Wonderland, written by the girl-power specialist Linda Woolverton, is a strange brew indeed: murky, diffuse, and meandering, set not in a Wonderland that pops with demented life but in a world called Underland that's like a joyless, bombed-out version of Wonderland. It looks like a CGI head trip gone post apocalyptic. In the film's rather humdrum 3-D, the place doesn't dazzle—it droops." Roger Ebert of the Chicago Sun-Times awarded the film three out of four stars and wrote in his review that, "Alice plays better as an adult hallucination, which is how Burton rather brilliantly interprets it until a pointless third act flies off the rails."

Several reviews criticized the decision to turn Alice into a "colonialist entrepreneur" at the end of the film setting sail for China. Given Britain's role in the First and Second Opium Wars during the Victorian era and the foreign domination of China through "unequal treaties", China expert Kevin Slaten writes, "Not only is it troubling imagery, for a female role model in a Disney movie, but it's also a celebration of the exploitation that China suffered for a century."

Game developer American McGee, best known for creating Alice and Alice: Madness Returns, was asked in a 2011 interview about Tim Burton's interpretation of the title character since both versions share a similar dark and twisted tone of Wonderland. McGee praised the film's visuals and audio but criticized the lack of screen time Alice had compared to the other characters. He felt Alice did not have any purpose in the story and that she was merely used as a "tool".

Accolades

Legacy

After the release and success of the movie, Walt Disney Pictures has announced the development of several live-action adaptations of their Animated Classics series. With the exception of Dumbo, Lady and the Tramp, Mulan,  and Pinocchio; The Lion King, Maleficent, Aladdin, Cinderella, The Jungle Book, Beauty and the Beast, and Christopher Robin have all followed to similar box-office results with the latter four also earning critical praise. Disney has also announced the development of live-action adaptations of Fantasia, The Sword in the Stone, The Black Cauldron, Peter Pan, The Little Mermaid, Snow White and the Seven Dwarfs, Lilo & Stitch, The Hunchback of Notre Dame, Bambi, Robin Hood, Hercules, and The Aristocats. The company also released Cruella, a live-action spin-off of One Hundred and One Dalmatians, and has plans for live-action spin-offs of Snow White and the Seven Dwarfs and Peter Pan along with a live-action prequel to Aladdin.

Walt Disney Theatrical was in early talks with Burton and screenwriter Linda Woolverton, who had previously written stage adaptions of The Lion King, Beauty and the Beast, Aida, and Lestat, to develop the property as a Broadway musical set to premiere in London. Rob Ashford was attached to direct and choreograph. As of 2013, no further developments had been made.

Sequel

On December 7, 2012, Variety announced the development of a sequel to Alice in Wonderland. Linda Woolverton returned to write a screenplay. On May 31, 2013, James Bobin began talks to direct the sequel under the working title Alice in Wonderland: Into the Looking Glass. Johnny Depp returned as The Hatter, Mia Wasikowska reprised the role of Alice, and Helena Bonham Carter returned as the Red Queen. Several other cast members from the 2010 film also reprised their roles in the sequel. On November 22, 2013, it was announced that the sequel will be released on May 27, 2016, and that Bobin would direct the film. Rhys Ifans and Sacha Baron Cohen are featured in the film. On January 21, 2014, the film was again retitled to Alice in Wonderland: Through the Looking Glass. The title was later reworked once again to Alice Through the Looking Glass.

See also

 2010 in film
 List of American films of 2010
 Films and television programmes based on Alice in Wonderland
 List of Walt Disney Pictures films
 List of Walt Disney Studios films (2010–2019)
 List of films featuring miniature people

References

External links

 
 
 
 
 
 
 

2010 3D films
2010 films
2010s fantasy adventure films
Alice in Wonderland (franchise)
American 3D films
American fantasy adventure films
American films with live action and animation
BAFTA winners (films)
Live-action films based on Disney's animated films
2010s English-language films
2010s feminist films
Films about dragons
Films about royalty
Films about size change
Films based on adaptations
Films based on Alice in Wonderland
Films based on multiple works
Films directed by Tim Burton
Films produced by Joe Roth
Films produced by Richard D. Zanuck
Films scored by Danny Elfman
Films set in 1871
Films set in castles
Films set in London
Films set in the Victorian era
Films set in Cornwall
Films shot in Cornwall
Films shot in Oxfordshire
Films that won the Best Costume Design Academy Award
Films whose art director won the Best Art Direction Academy Award
High fantasy films
IMAX films
Mariticide in fiction
Films using motion capture
Fiction about regicide
Films with screenplays by Linda Woolverton
Walt Disney Pictures films
Walt Disney Records soundtracks
Films produced by Suzanne Todd
The Zanuck Company films
2010s American films
American films about revenge